Herbert C. Kodilinye was the fourth Vice Chancellor of the University of Nigeria, Nsukka. One of his publications was on retinoblastoma and his area of specialization was Ophthalmology.

He was inducted as a Foundation Fellow of the Nigerian Academy of Science in 1977.

References 

Year of birth missing
Year of death missing
Academic staff of the University of Nigeria
Vice-Chancellors of the University of Nigeria
Nigerian ophthalmologists